Thomas of Lancaster, 2nd Earl of Lancaster, 2nd Earl of Leicester, 2nd Earl of Derby, jure uxoris 4th Earl of Lincoln and jure uxoris 5th Earl of Salisbury ( 1278 – 22 March 1322) was an English nobleman. A member of the House of Plantagenet, he was one of the leaders of the baronial opposition to his first cousin, King Edward II.

Family 

Thomas was the eldest son of Edmund Crouchback and Blanche of Artois, Queen Dowager of Navarre and niece of King Louis IX of France. Crouchback was the son of King Henry III of England.

His marriage to Alice de Lacy was not successful. They had no children together, while he fathered, illegitimately, two sons named John and Thomas. In 1317 Alice was abducted from her manor at Canford, Dorset, by Richard de St Martin, a knight in the service of John de Warenne, 7th Earl of Surrey. This incident caused a feud between Lancaster and Surrey; Lancaster seized two of Surrey's castles in retaliation. King Edward then intervened, and the two earls came to an uneasy truce. Thomas continued to hold the powerful earldoms of Lincoln and Salisbury. This was due to the marriage contract the two families had agreed; upon the death of his father-in-law, Thomas would hold these earldoms in his own right, not, as would be expected, in right of his wife.

Career

On reaching full age he became hereditary sheriff of Lancashire, but spent most of the next ten years fighting for Edward I in Scotland, leaving the shrievalty in the care of deputies. He was present at the Battle of Falkirk in 1298 as part of Edward I's wing of the army.

He served in the coronation of his cousin, King Edward II of England, on 25 February 1308, carrying Curtana, the sword of Edward the Confessor. At the beginning of the king's reign, Lancaster openly supported Edward, but as the conflict between the king and the nobles wore on, Lancaster's allegiances changed. He despised the royal favourite, Piers Gaveston, who mocked him as "the Fiddler", and swore revenge when Gaveston demanded that the king dismiss one of Lancaster's retainers.

Lancaster was one of the Lords Ordainers who demanded the banishment of Gaveston and the establishment of a baronial oligarchy. His private army helped separate the king and Gaveston, and Lancaster was one of the "judges" who convicted Gaveston and saw him executed in 1312.

After the disaster at Bannockburn in 1314, Edward submitted to Lancaster, who in effect became ruler of England. He attempted to govern for the next four years, but was unable to keep order or prevent the Scots from raiding and retaking territory in the North. In 1318 his popularity with the barons declined and he was persuaded "to accept a diminished authority."

The new leadership, eventually headed by Hugh le Despenser, 1st Earl of Winchester, and his son Hugh the younger Despenser, proved no more popular with the baronage, and in 1321 Lancaster was again at the head of a rebellion. This time he was defeated at the Battle of Boroughbridge on 16 March 1322, and taken prisoner.

Lancaster was tried by a tribunal consisting of, among others, the two Despensers, Edmund FitzAlan, 9th Earl of Arundel, and King Edward. Lancaster was not allowed to speak in his own defence, nor was he allowed to have anyone to speak for him. He was convicted of treason and sentenced to death. Because of their kinship and Lancaster's royal blood, the king commuted the sentence to beheading, as opposed to being hanged, drawn and beheaded, and Lancaster was executed on 22 March 1322 near Pontefract Castle.

Upon his death, his titles and estates were forfeited, but in 1323 his younger brother Henry successfully petitioned to take possession of the earldom of Leicester, and in 1326 or 1327 Parliament posthumously reversed Thomas's conviction, and Henry was further permitted to take possession of the earldoms of Lancaster, Derby, Salisbury and Lincoln.

Soon after Thomas's death, miracles were reported at his tomb at Pontefract, and he became venerated as a martyr and saint. In 1327 the Commons petitioned Edward III to ask for his canonisation, and popular veneration continued until the reformation.

On 23 March 1822, Thomas's remains were discovered in a large stone coffin buried in a field in the parish of Ferry Fryston. In 1942 it was reported by E. J. Rudsdale that some of Thomas's bones had been found in a box at Paskell's auctioneers in Colchester, Essex, having been removed from Pontefract Castle in 1885.

Titles and lands 

From his father, Thomas inherited the earldoms of Lancaster, Leicester and a Ferrers earldom of Derby.
By his marriage to Alice de Lacy, Countess of Lincoln, daughter and heiress of Henry de Lacy, 3rd Earl of Lincoln, he became Earl of Lincoln, Earl of Salisbury, 11th Baron of Halton and 7th Lord of Bowland upon the death of his father-in-law in 1311. Master of five earldoms, he was one of the wealthiest and most powerful men in England. Thomas was in possession of many key fortresses, including Clitheroe Castle, particularly in northern England. He was responsible for the extension of Pontefract Castle and in 1313 he began the construction of Dunstanburgh Castle, a massive fortress in Northumberland.

Arms 
Inherited from his father, Thomas bore the arms of the kingdom, differenced by a label France of three points (that is to say azure three fleur-de-lys or, each).

Genealogical table
Thomas was closely related to both the Capetian kings of France and the Plantagenet kings of England. His contemporaries commented that "as each parent was of royal stock, he was clearly of nobler descent than the other earls".

Footnotes

References

Further reading
 
 

1270s births
1322 deaths
13th-century English nobility
14th-century English nobility
2nd Earl of Leicester
2
English rebels
Executed English people
High Sheriffs of Lancashire
Thomas Plantagenet
Lord High Stewards
People executed under the Plantagenets by decapitation
People executed under the Plantagenets for treason against England
Barons of Halton
Earls of Lancaster